Macroplea appendiculata is a species of leaf beetle of the subfamily Donaciinae which can be found in Northern and Central Europe.

Description
The first segment of hind tarsi much shorter than the second. Notum almost square. Thorn on top of elytron is long and thin. The head and shield with a red-yellow hairs, prothorax and elytra have a yellow color, the points in the grooves between rows, and often prominent on elytra back.

Ecology
Beetles are found near rivers and lakes, they feed on generally pondweed (Potamogeton) and Myriophyllum plants.

References

Beetles described in 1794
Beetles of Europe
Taxa named by Georg Wolfgang Franz Panzer
Donaciinae